The Wright Model R was a single-seat biplane built by the Wright Company in Dayton, Ohio, in 1910. Also known as the Roadster or the Baby Wright, it was designed for speed and altitude competitions.

Design
The Wright Model R was derived from the Wright Model B, and was a two-bay biplane with rear-mounted twin rudders mounted in front of a single elevator and carried on wire-braced wood booms behind the wing. It was powered by a  Wright four-cylinder inline water-cooled engine driving a pair of pusher propellers via chains.

Operational history

Two examples were flown at the International Aviation Tournament at Belmont Park in November 1910, one being a standard model flown by Alec Ogilvie and the other being a special competition model known as the Baby Grand, which had a  V-8 engine and a reduced wingspan of 21 ft 5 in (6.53 m). Both aircraft were entered for the second Gordon Bennett Trophy competition which was held at the meeting, but the Baby Grand, flown by Walter Brookins, suffered an engine failure during a trial flight on the race day and crashed heavily. Ogilvie's aircraft also had engine problems, having to make a stop of nearly an hour to make repairs, but was nevertheless placed third.

Ogilvie also flew his aircraft in the 1912 Gordon Bennet competition, re-engined with a  N.E.C. engine.

Specifications

References
Notes

Bibliography
  McFarland, Marvin (ed), The Papers of Wilbur and Orville Wright vol. 2. New York: McGraw-Hill, 1953, p. 1199.
  Munson, Kenneth, Pioneer Aircraft 1903-1914. London: Blandford, 1969.

External links

"Mr Ogilvie's Wright Biplane" Flight 28 January 1911.

Model R
1910s United States experimental aircraft
Single-engined twin-prop pusher aircraft
Aircraft first flown in 1910